The Cannonball Baker Sea-To-Shining-Sea Memorial Trophy Dash, widely known as the Cannonball Baker or Cannonball Run, was an unofficial, unsanctioned automobile race run five times in the 1970s from New York City and Darien, Connecticut, on the East Coast of the United States to the Portofino Inn in the Los Angeles suburb of Redondo Beach, California. The Cannonball Run races have additionally inspired numerous contemporary efforts by independent teams to set the record time for the route, known as the Cannonball Run Challenge.

Conceived by car magazine writer and auto racer Brock Yates and fellow Car and Driver editor Steve Smith, the first run was not a competitive race as only one team was running. The run was intended both as a celebration of the United States Interstate Highway System and as a protest against strict traffic laws coming into effect at the time. Another motivation was the fun involved, which showed in the tongue-in-cheek reports in Car and Driver and other auto publications worldwide. The initial cross-country run was made by Yates; his son, Brock Yates, Jr.; Steve Smith; and friend Jim Williams beginning on May 3, 1971, in a 1971 Dodge Custom Sportsman van called the "Moon Trash II."

The race was run four more times: November 15, 1971; November 13, 1972; April 23, 1975; and April 1, 1979.

Car and Driver magazine detailed the November 1971 running in its March 1972 issue. That article was reprinted to represent the 1970s on the magazine's 50th anniversary in 2005. A remarkable effort was made by American racing legend Dan Gurney, winner of the 1967 24 hours of Le Mans. He won the second Cannonball in a Sunoco blue Ferrari 365 GTB/4 Daytona. Gurney said, "At no time did we exceed ." He and Brock Yates as co-driver took 35 hours 54 minutes to travel  at an average of approximately  while collecting one fine. Snow in the Rocky Mountains slowed them down considerably.

In 1972 the team of Steve "Yogi" Behr, Bill Canfield, and Fred Olds won in a Cadillac Coupe de Ville, the first American car to win a Cannonball.

On April 23–25, 1975, Jack May and Rick Cline drove a Dino 246 GTS from the Red Ball Garage in New York City
in a record time of 35 hours 53 minutes, averaging .

The record for official Cannonballs is 32 hours 51 minutes (about ), set in the final run from Darien, Connecticut, to Los Angeles by Dave Heinz and Dave Yarborough in a Jaguar XJ-S in April 1979.

After the original Cannonball races, Car and Driver sponsored legitimate closed-course tours, the One Lap of America. Outlaw successors in the United States, Europe, and Australia continue to use the Cannonball name without Yates' approval.

The race
The object of the Cannonball was to leave the Red Ball Garage on East 31st Street in Manhattan, New York City (1979: Darien, Connecticut, at now-defunct Lock, Stock, and Barrel restaurant, Goodwives Shopping Center), typically after midnight, and drive to the Portofino Inn in Redondo Beach, California, in the shortest time possible. Those were the only rules.

Nothing was specified as to the route, type of vehicle, number of drivers or crew, or maximum speed permitted. There was a gentlemen's agreement that the vehicle entered would be driven the entire distance (not transported on another vehicle, not abandoned for an identical second vehicle hidden near the finish, etc.) Speeding citations received along the way were the driver's responsibility and did not disqualify the vehicle, although stopping to receive a ticket increased the vehicle's overall time.

The Cannonball Run was technically a race in that the team with the fastest time was declared the "winner" and the results were announced in order of time. However, times were not taken very seriously, and sheer speed did not guarantee a first-place finish.

Inspiration
The Cannonball Run gained notoriety after the 1972 run, but the Time story on the 1975 Jack May-Rick Cline race solidified its place in the public consciousness. To the surprise of many, the hilarious reports in Car and Driver were warmly received by press and public alike rather than condemned for the race's recklessness.

In his Cannonball! memoir, Yates reports that in 1972 an all-female team of Peggy Niemcek, Judy Stropus, and SCCA racer Donna Mae Mims ("The Pink Lady") suffered a crash near El Paso, Texas, resulting in a DNF (Did Not Finish). Mims explains that their Cadillac stretch limousine veered off the road and rolled over after the driver fell asleep at the wheel. Although the car was destroyed and she suffered a broken arm, no other vehicles were involved in the crash. This was the only serious accident in the official Cannonball races.

Yates began working on a screenplay to be entitled Coast to Coast but was scooped by two "unofficial" films in 1976, Cannonball and The Gumball Rally. Eventually, an "official" Cannonball Run film was made, The Cannonball Run starring Burt Reynolds, Roger Moore and Dom DeLuise with Yates in a cameo appearance. Two sequels, Cannonball Run II and Speed Zone, also known as Cannonball Fever, followed. A later USA Network television program, Cannonball Run 2001, was given official approval to use the name.

U.S. Express

After the last Cannonball, Rick Doherty, a veteran of the 1975 and 1979 races, organized a successor, the U.S. Express (1980–1983). The 1980 U.S. Express ran from Brooklyn, New York, to the beach in Santa Monica. Doherty won the first U.S. Express with co-driver and famous game designer Will Wright at the wheel of a Mazda RX-7. Their time was 33 hours 9 minutes.

In 1981 the U.S. Express ran from Long Island, New York, to Emeryville, California, which borders Oakland at the east end of the San Francisco–Oakland Bay Bridge). Interstate 80 was largely the route of choice. The winning team in 1981 was the first-time Express team of David Morse and Steve Clausman driving Morse's gray Porsche 928. One unique road hazard in the 1981 run was an early snowfall that closed the Donner Pass for several hours to vehicles without chains just as the U.S. Express cars approached. The Porsche 928, which carried special plastic chains, was able to proceed.  Others had to wait for the pass to open. The Morse-Clausman team competed again the next two years. In 1982 (also to Emeryville), they endured several memorable police stops. In the final U.S. Express in 1983 to Newport Beach, California, they placed second.

Although longer than the Cannonball, the fastest time recorded for the U.S. Express was 32 hours 7 minutes in the 1983 race, 44 minutes faster than the fastest Cannonball, and the "official" cross-country record until it was broken in 2006 by Alex Roy and David Maher in 31 hours 4 minutes.

Legacy

Decades after the last official Cannonball in 1979, issues raised and revival possibilities interested some motorists. Yates recalled declining offers to revive the concept because it was unworkable. His reasons included: increased police activity, increased legal liabilities for any organizer, increased year-round traffic, and expanding urban areas. He also warned of the obvious dangers of a race on public roads.

The Gumball 3000 gained publicity in the early 2000s as a similar event, sometimes held on coast-to-coast U.S. routes, but paced over a route several times as long and with no time-based winner.

The unofficial transcontinental record, known as the Cannonball Run Challenge, has been broken numerous times since the last official Cannonball Trophy Dash.

Post-US Express Events

C2C Express Event

The C2C Express was an organized event that was created by Ben Wilson of New Zealand and Eric Propst of Michigan. The event was intended to be limited to pre 1980 automobiles that cost under $3000. This was intended to keep the cost affordable and In the spirit of the original runs of the 1970s. The event spanned from 2015–2019. The run Ran from the traditional Cannonball Route of Redball Garage in Manhattan to The Portofino Inn at Redondo beach California. The original event only had 3 competitors in which Wilson won in his Cadillac with a time of just under 40 hours. Over the next 3 years the event grew to the point that the final coast to coast run planned ballooned to over 40 entrants. The size of the event gave Wilson and Propst the idea to run their final coast to coast event from Darien, Connecticut to Portofino Inn located in Los Angeles. Darien to Portofino was the same route run as the 1979 Cannonball and became a 40-year anniversary tribute to the event. Over 40 teams registered for the event, 33 competed and 24 finished. Amongst the final event was a team of police officers in a 49 Pontiac, an ambulance driven by John Ficarra, a Lexus driven by record holder Ed Bolian, a vintage Monte Carlo piloted by current record holders Doug Tabbut & Arne Toman. Wilson and Propst both competed as well, Wilson drove a Ford Van and Propst a Crown Victoria. The winning time was 31:47.

On September 15, 2019, the Cannonball route event record of 32:05 set by Ed Bolian in 2015, was broken during the 2019 running of the C2C Express. Fred Ashmore Jr of Hancock, Maine, and Travis Hilton of College Station, Texas with Arthur Ashmore of Lamoine, Maine, set a new Cannonball Route event record of 31:47. Using the longer 1979 Cannonball Route, (from Darien to the Portofino Marina) the team was able to cover the 2872 miles in their period-accurate, minimally equipped 1979 Mustang. This made them the second team to ever eclipse the 32:07 benchmark on the Cannonball route in an event over 36 years.

Michael A. Preston Four Ball Rally 1981-1984

The Four Ball Rally was a quasi-legal race from Boston to San Diego. It was run from 1981 to 1984, and stands as the last of the true competitive cross-continent road races held in the twentieth century. The rally's official name was the Michael A. Preston Memorial Four Ball Rally(FBR) in commemoration of its founder, who died prior to the first event. The FBR was conceived to be the longest practical distance race between two major cities in the continental United States.  The rally had multiple route options determined real time by the driving teams and generally exceed 3100 miles. On average the race was 250 to 300 miles longer than the Original Sea to Shining sea rallies of the 1970s. Up to 50 entries, including international teams, were selected to participate. The event was "invitation only", and generally was restricted to professional drivers and others with documented driving experience.

On June 3, 1984, the team of Edward M. Rahill, of Barrington Ill. and Timothy Montgomery, of Fremont OH. driving a performance and range enhanced Pontiac Trans Am, won the race in a record time of 35:46, despite several hours of delays due to two arrests and mechanical issues during the race. This time still stands today as the fastest documented time for a race crossing the continental United States between Boston and San Diego. A significant point reference was that Rahill and Montgomery were believed to be out of the race after their two arrests and mechanical breakdown in Illinois. Race records indicated the team were able to reach an average speed between St. Louis to San Diego, including stops, exceeding 104 miles an hour.

An interesting development coming out of the race was the near celebrity status of Ohio State Trooper Sargent Roger Teague who apprehended four participants including Rahill and Montgomery, the eventual winners of the event. Sargent Teague was awarded the 1984 Super Trooper Award by the FBR races sponsors and attended the winner’s banquet with his wife to receive his recognition.

The 1984 Four Ball Rally received coverage from National and International News sources such the AP, UPI, New York Times, Chicago Sun Times, Paul Harvey’s June 5, 1984 broadcast and 73 other newspaper organizations on June 4 and 5. The level of police enforcement was so intense, of the twenty seven cars that had planned to leave Boston that day, only eleven were to finish.  The New York State Police alone arrested seven participants. The level of coordinated national police effort to stop the race was unprecedented in American history and led to its discontinuation as the increase in national publicity and added attention from law enforcement made running the event untenable.

Bob Burns C2C2C memorial trophy dash 
The Bob Burns or C2C2C is a new spin on the cannonball run. The event uses the original starting points of the Red ball garage or Goodwives shopping center and uses the Portofino Inn as a halfway point. Drivers can use any route they like so long as this criteria is met. When Chris Clemens saw a sign being put up at the Pennsylvania border that said "sorry, we're closed" on RT80 the thought occurred to him to not only do another cannonball run, but to do it twice on a timed run. Chris decided to make a maiden trip for time to see what was realistic and named the event after his recently passed uncle. The car used was a 1999 Mercedes SL 500 previously owned by Bob Burns that Chris had been given by his Aunt Patty. The first run began on May 2, 2020 when Chris Clemens and Mark Spence set out experiencing many hardships on their run including traffic, street racers in Las Vegas and hours on George Washington bridge and set a time of 74 hours and 5 minutes.Road and track article At the time of writing, the event was attempted 23 times with 2 teams besting the initial time set by Chris Clemens and Mark spence. One other completed the event but did not beat 74:05.

Australian "Cannonball Runs" 
Various versions of the cannonball run have been run in Australia. Like the original cannon ball run, these were coast to coast races, though in this case, they started on the east coast of Australia and finished on the West coast, in Perth. They were mostly run in the 1980s, as one off or two off events. The Cannonball Sea To Shining Sea Paradise to Perth Trophy was run on October 22, 1984 and went from Surfers Paradise in Queensland to Perth in Western Australia. Only three teams competed and the winning car completing the trip in 31 hours was a Pontiac, driven by a team of 3. The event ran a second and final time in 1986.

Another race, Australian Cannonball Cup, ran on November 2, 1984 from the outskirts of Melbourne to Fremantle in Western Australia. This event however, had some co-operation with the police. It was a legal race, and the contestants were supposed to be following the speed limit. 33 teams competed and there was some controversy after the race when the first-placed team were disqualified after it was discovered that they had been caught by police for speeding. The second-paced team, with a time of 33 hours and 4 minutes, were then awarded first prize.

In 1994 the first and only Cannonball Run in Australia ran from Darwin to Yularu and back again. Based on similar events in the United States, this event ended in tragedy when an out of control Ferrari F40  crashed into a checkpoint south of Alice Springs, resulting in the death of the two event officials manning the checkpoint as well as the two competitors. The remainder of the race had a 180 km/h (112 mph) speed limit imposed to prevent further accidents.

See also
APEX: The Secret Race Across America (Documentary)
Cannonball Run Challenge about the speed record for driving across the United States
Need for Speed: The Run
Street racing about the practice of illegally using public roadways for automobile races

References

External links
"Gurney/Yates Cop First Cannonball", Brad Niemcek on the 1971 race
Jack May, 1975 Cannonball champion with Rick Cline. 

Auto races in the United States
1971 establishments in the United States
Recurring events established in 1971
Recurring events disestablished in 1979